Jacob Samuel Speyer (20 December 1849 – 1 November 1913) was a Dutch philologist and translator from Sanskrit.

Biography
Born to a Jewish family in Amsterdam, Jacob Samuel Speyer first attended the Gymnasium before joining the Athenaeum Illustre at the age of not yet 16. He afterwards studied classics at Amsterdam for three years, and then Sanskrit at the University of Leiden, from where he awarded a Ph.D. on 21 December 1872.

Speyer thereafter officiated as teacher at Hoorn and (1873–1888) at the gymnasium of Amsterdam. On 15 October 1877, he was appointed lecturer in Sanskrit and comparative philology at the University of Amsterdam, and he was about to receive a professorship there when he was called to Gröningen as professor of Latin in December 1888. He held this chair until 20 March 1903, when he was appointed to succeed his former teacher Hendrik Kern as professor of Sanskrit at the University of Leiden.

Among other publications, Speyer was the author of an English translation of the Jatakamala, which appeared as the first volume of Max Müller's Sacred Books of the Buddhists, as well as an English version of the Avadanasataka. He was a member of the Royal Academy of Arts and Sciences from 1889, and a knight of the Order of the Netherlands Lion. From 1893 to 1904 he was editor of the Museum.

Partial bibliography

 
  Program of the Gymnasium of Amsterdam.

References
 

1849 births
1913 deaths
19th-century philologists
Dutch academic administrators
Dutch Jews
Dutch philologists
Dutch Sanskrit scholars
Jewish linguists
Academic staff of Leiden University
Members of the Royal Netherlands Academy of Arts and Sciences
Sanskrit–English translators
Academic staff of the University of Amsterdam
Academic staff of the University of Groningen